The New Thing & the Blue Thing is an album by American trumpeter Ted Curson which was recorded in 1965 and released on the Atlantic label.

Reception

Allmusic awarded the album 3 stars. JazzTimes stated " Curson's soaring lines and brilliant trumpet sound are well-matched by Barron, who was at the top of his form on this date. Neither was really an avantgardist by 1965 standards, but both were interesting modern voices whose best work came when they were pushing the limits". Jazz Review said "Most of this session is fairly straightahead hard-bop, played with great but unsurprising elan, recalling the Blue Note & Prestige glory days. But the last two tunes, "Reava's Waltz" and "Elephant Walk," Curson & Co. really soar with some fiery solos and some jagged, volatile Mingus-inspired writing and ensemble playing".

Track listing
All compositions by Ted Curson except as indicated
 "Straight Ice" - 5:36
 "Star Eyes" (Gene de Paul, Don Raye) - 5:40
 "Ted's Tempo" - 5:19
 "Nu Blu" - 9:12
 Reava's Waltz" - 4:18
 "Elephant Walk" - 5:30

Personnel
Ted Curson - trumpet
Bill Barron - tenor saxophone
Georges Arvanitas - piano
Herb Bushler - bass
Dick Berk - drums

References

1965 albums
Atlantic Records albums
Ted Curson albums
Albums produced by Arif Mardin